Hossein Beg Laleh Shamlu was a Qizilbash officer of Turkoman origin, who occupied high offices under the Safavid king Ismail I (r. 1501–1524) and was the first person to serve as the vakil (vicegerent) of the empire.

Biography 
Hossein belonged to the Shamlu tribe, one of the seven Turkoman tribes of the Qizilbash, a Shia militant group, which supported the young Safaviyya leader Ismail I, who had taken refuge in Gilan to avoid the Aq Qoyunlu, a Turkic tribal federation which controlled most of Iran. During Ismail's stay in Gilan, Hossein Beg served as his guardian and mentor. In 1500, Ismail came out of hiding and with the aid of the Qizilbash, invaded Shirvan, killing its ruler Farrukh Yassar. In 1501, all of Shirvan, Arran and Azerbaijan was under the control of Ismail, who laid foundation to the Safavid dynasty.

He then appointed Hossein Beg as the vakil of the empire and the commander-in-chief (amir al-umara) of the Qizilbash army. By 1504, all of present-day Iran was under the control of Ismail. In 1507, Hossein Beg campaigned in western Iran, where he was ambushed by a group of Kurds and as a result lost 300 men. During the same year, Ismail appointed the Iranian Mir Najm Zargar Gilani as the new vakil. One year later, an Safavid army under Hossein Beg and Ismail captured Baghdad. In 1509/10, Hossein Beg lost his office as commander-in-chief in favor to a man of humble origins, Muhammad Beg Ustajlu. In 1512, Hossein Beg, along with the rest of the Qizilbash commanders, betrayed the Safavid vakil Najm-e Sani and left him to die at the Battle of Ghazdewan.

Hossein Beg later took part in the Ismail's war against the Ottomans, but was killed at the Battle of Chaldiran in 1514.

References

Sources 

 
 
 
 
 
 

Military personnel killed in action
Iranian Turkmen people
Shamlu
1514 deaths
15th-century births
Vakils of Safavid Iran
Commanders-in-chief of Safavid Iran
16th-century people of Safavid Iran
Safavid governors of Azerbaijan